Bedok Constituency was a single member constituency in Bedok South, Singapore. It was formed in 1976 general elections by craving a portion from Siglap constituency and continues throughout till prior to 1988 general elections where this constituency along with neighbouring constituencies namely: Kampong Chai Chee and Tanah Merah to form the Bedok Group Representation Constituency.

Member of Parliament

Elections

Elections in 1970s

Elections in 1980s

Notes

References

Brief History on People's Front (Dormant after the 1976's GE)

Bedok
Singaporean electoral divisions
Constituencies established in 1976
Constituencies disestablished in 1988
1976 establishments in Singapore
1988 disestablishments in Singapore